This is a list of French television related events from 1987.

Events
4 April - Christine Minier is selected to represent France at the 1987 Eurovision Song Contest with her song "Les mots d'amour n'ont pas de dimanche". She is selected to be the thirtieth French Eurovision entry during a national final.

Debuts

Domestic
12 September - La Une est à vous (1973-1976, 1987-1994)

International
4 May -  Kate & Allie (1984-1989) (Antenne 2)

Television shows

1940s
Le Jour du Seigneur (1949–present)

1950s
Présence protestante (1955-)

1960s
Les Dossiers de l'écran (1967-1991)
Les Animaux du monde (1969-1990)

1970s
30 millions d'amis (1976-2016)

1980s
Dimanche Martin
Julien Fontanes, magistrat (1980-1989)
Mardi Cinéma  (1982-1988)
Questions à domicile (1985-1989)

Ending this year
Alain Decaux raconte (1969-1987)
Les Jeux de 20 Heures (1976-1987)

Births
10 November - Caroline Receveur, TV & web personality

Deaths

See also
1987 in France
List of French films of 1987